Jerry Richardson (1936–2023) was an American businessman, football player and owner of the Carolina Panthers of the National Football League.

Jerry Richardson may also refer to:

Jerry Richardson (defensive back) (born 1941), American football defensive back
Jerry Richardson (basketball), US basketball player and coach

See also

Gerry Richardson (1932–1971), British police superintendent
Jerome Richardson (disambiguation)